Skrbek (feminine Skrbková) is a Czech surname. Notable people with the surname include:

 Lola Skrbková (1902–1978), Czech actress
 Milada Skrbková (1897–1935), Czech tennis player
 Oto Skrbek, Czech soldier and skier, competitor in the 1948 Winter Olympics (military patrol)
 Pavel Skrbek (born 1978), Czech ice hockey player

Czech-language surnames